Miha Štrukelj is a visual artist working in painting, drawing, and site-specific work.

Career 
Štrukelj's work has been included in the National Collection of the Museum of Modern Art in Ljubljana. He has also been selected for "Slovenian Art 1995–2005" and "Seven Sins; Ljubljana–Moscow" at the same museum.

His work has been presented in "Vitamin P; New Perspectives in Painting" by Phaidon Press.

In 2009, he was an artist-in-residence at the International Studio & Curatorial Program (ISCP) in New York.

Style 
His art explores the mechanism of perception and (de-)construction of images, examining the position of individuals in urban landscapes and how built environment defines their existence.

Accolades 
Štrukelj has received three awards–a grant from the Pollock-Krasner Foundation 2008-09, the Henkel Drawing Award 2008, and the working scholarship of the Slovenian Ministry of Culture.

Life 
Štrukelj was born 1973 in Ljubljana, Slovenia. He lives and works in Ljubljana.

He represented Slovenia at the Venice Biennial in 2009.

References

External links
 Miha Štrukelj's website
 Slovenian Pavilion 2009

Artists from Ljubljana
1973 births
Living people